Below are the results for season 12 (XII) of the World Poker Tour

Results

Merit Cyprus Classic
 Casino: Merit Crystal Cove Hotel and Casino, Alsancak Mevkii Kyrenia, Cyprus
 Buy-in: $4,000 + $400
 6-Day Event: August 16-21, 2013
 Number of Entries: 262
 Total Prize Pool: $1,000,000
 Number of Payouts: 27

Legends of Poker
 Casino: The Bicycle Casino, Bell Gardens, California
 Buy-in: $3,500 + $200
 7-Day Event: August 29-September 4, 2013
 Number of Entries: 716
 Total Prize Pool: $2,430,820
 Number of Payouts: 72

Borgata Poker Open
 Casino: Borgata, Atlantic City, New Jersey
 Buy-in: $3,300 + 200
 6-Day Event: September 15-20, 2013
 Number of Entries: 1,189
 Total Prize Pool: $3,805,989
 Number of Payouts: 110

Grand Prix de Paris
 Casino: Aviation Club de France, Paris, France
 Buy-in: €7,500
 6-Day Event: October 25-30, 2013
 Number of Entries: 187
 Total Prize Pool: €1,839,496
 Number of Payouts: 21

Emperors Palace Poker Classic
 Casino: Emperors Palace Hotel Casino, Johannesburg, South Africa
 Buy-in: $3,300 + $300
 5-Day Event: November 7-11, 2013
 Number of Entries: 191
 Total Prize Pool: $561,528
 Number of Payouts: 27

bestbet Jacksonville Fall Poker Scramble
 Casino: bestbet Jacksonville, Jacksonville, Florida
 Buy-in: $3,200 + $240
 5-Day Event: November 15-19, 2013
 Number of Entries: 358
 Total Prize Pool: $1,145,600
 Number of Payouts: 45

WPT Caribbean
 Casino: Casino Royale, St. Maarten
 Buy-in: $3,200 + $300
 6-Day Event: November 19-24, 2013
 Number of Entries: 191
 Total Prize Pool: $592,864
 Number of Payouts: 24

WPT Montreal
 Casino: Playground Poker Club, Kahnawake, Quebec
 Buy-in: $3,500 + $350
 7-Day Event: November 29-December 5, 2013
 Number of Entries: 862
 Total Prize Pool: $2,738,435
 Number of Payouts: 99

Doyle Brunson Five Diamond World Poker Classic
 Casino: Bellagio, Las Vegas, Nevada
 Buy-in: $10,000 + $300
 6-Day Event: December 6-11, 2013
 Number of Entries: 449
 Total Prize Pool: $4,355,300
 Number of Payouts: 45

WPT South Korea
 Casino: Ramada Plaza Jeju, Jeju, South Korea
 Buy-in: $2,700 + $300
 4-Day Event: December 16-19, 2013
 Number of Entries: 137
 Total Prize Pool: $358,803
 Number of Payouts: 21

WPT Prague
 Casino: Card Casino Prague, Prague, Czech Republic
 Buy-in: €3,300
 7-Day Event: December 15-21, 2013
 Number of Entries: 306
 Total Prize Pool: €881,550
 Number of Payouts: 36

Borgata Winter Poker Open
 Casino: Borgata, Atlantic City, New Jersey
 Buy-in: $3,300 + $200
 6-Day Event: January 26-31, 2014
 Number of Entries: 1,229
 Total Prize Pool: $3,934,029
 Number of Payouts: 120

Lucky Hearts Poker Open
 Casino: Seminole Casino Coconut Creek, Coconut Creek, Florida
 Buy-in: $3,250 + $175 + $75
 6-Day Event: February 7-12, 2014
 Number of Entries: 415
 Total Prize Pool: $1,348,750
 Number of Payouts: 54

Fallsview Poker Classic
 Casino: Fallsview Casino, Niagara Falls, Ontario
 Buy-in: $5,000
 3-Day Event: February 22-24, 2014
 Number of Entries: 383
 Total Prize Pool: $1,729,510
 Number of Payouts: 45

L.A. Poker Classic
 Casino: Commerce Casino, Commerce, California
 Buy-in: $9,600 + $400
 6-Day Event: March 1-6, 2014
 Number of Entries: 534
 Total Prize Pool: $5,126,400
 Number of Payouts: 63

Bay 101 Shooting Star
 Casino: Bay 101, San Jose, California
 Buy-in: $7,150 + $350
 5-Day Event: March 10-14, 2014
 Number of Entries: 718
 Total Prize Pool: $5,133,700
 Number of Payouts: 72

WPT Venice Carnival
 Casino: Casino di Venezia Ca Vendramin Calergi, Venice, Italy
 Buy-in: €2,700 + €300
 6-Day Event: March 10-15, 2014
 Number of Entries: 144
 Total Prize Pool: €377,136
 Number of Payouts: 18

WPT Thunder Valley
 Casino: Thunder Valley Casino, Lincoln, California
 Buy-in: $3,200 + $300
 5-Day Event: March 15-19, 2014
 Number of Entries: 465
 Total Prize Pool: $1,488,000
 Number of Payouts: 54

Jacksonville bestbet Open
 Casino: bestbet Jacksonville, Jacksonville, Florida
 Buy-in: $3,200 + $240 + $60
 5-Day Event: March 21-25, 2014
 Number of Entries: 258
 Total Prize Pool: $825,600
 Number of Payouts: 27

Seminole Hard Rock Showdown
 Casino: Seminole Hard Rock Hotel and Casino, Hollywood, Florida
 Buy-in: $3,500
 7-Day Event: April 10-16, 2014
 Number of Entries: 1,795
 Total Prize Pool: $5,763,150
 Number of Payouts: 170

WPT World Championship
 Casino: Borgata, Atlantic City, New Jersey
 Buy-in: $15,000 + $400
 5-Day Event: April 22-26, 2014
 Number of Entries: 328
 Total Prize Pool: $4,852,400
 Number of Payouts: 36

References

World Poker Tour
2013 in poker
2014 in poker